is a Japanese musician. He plays lead guitar in the band Mr. Children.

Early life
He was born in Fukuoka, and moved to Nakano, Tokyo. He attended Komae Daini Junior High School in Tokyo, where he met the other future band members Keisuke Nakagawa and Hideya Suzuki.

Guitars used
 Gibson Les Paul Standard
 Seymour Duncan DS-185
 Guitars R US Telecaster Thinline

External links
 Discogs
 Apple Music
 Yahoo News (in Japanese)

References

Living people
People from Fukuoka
1969 births